Comitas rotundata is a species of sea snail, a marine gastropod mollusc in the family Pseudomelatomidae, the turrids and allies.

Description
The white, slender shell has a fusiform shape, and an acuminate, turreted spire. It contains 10 whorls. The protoconch is subglobose and smooth. The subsequent whorls are angulated in the middle, concave in the upper portion and contracted below. The plicae are delicate, oblique, about thirteen in number, and very short, commencing at the median angle and scarcely reaching the suture below. The aperture and the long siphonal canal measure about ½ the total length. The outer lip is tenuous, widely sinuate and prominently arcuate in the middle, and near the suture slightly sinuate. The columella is smooth and almost upright. The narrow siphonal canal is slightly oblique.

Distribution
This marine species occurs off the Andamans.

References

  E.A. Smith, Illustrations of the Zoology of H.M. Indian Marine Surveying Steamer Investigator. Part I: Mollusca (1897-1908)

External links
 

breviplicata
Gastropods described in 1899